The 1899–1900 FA Cup was the 29th staging of the world's oldest association football competition, the Football Association Challenge Cup (more usually known as the FA Cup), and the last to be held fully in the 19th Century. The cup was won by Bury, who defeated Southampton 4–0 in the final of the competition, played at Crystal Palace in London.

Matches were scheduled to be played at the stadium of the team named first on the date specified for each round, which was always a Saturday. If scores were level after 90 minutes had been played, a replay would take place at the stadium of the second-named team later the same week. If the replayed match was drawn further replays would be held at neutral venues until a winner was determined. If scores were level after 90 minutes had been played in a replay, a 30-minute period of extra time would be played.

Calendar
The format of the FA Cup for the season had a preliminary round, five qualifying rounds, three proper rounds, and the semi finals and final.

First round proper
The first round proper contained sixteen ties between 32 teams. 17 of the 18 First Division sides were given a bye to this round, as were The Wednesday and Bolton Wanderers from the Second Division, and non-league Southampton, Bristol City and Tottenham Hotspur. Glossop, along with all the other Second Division sides, were entered into the Third Qualifying round. Of those sides, only Grimsby Town, Walsall and Leicester Fosse qualified to the FA Cup proper. Seven non-league sides also qualified.

The matches were played on Saturday, 27 January 1900. Six matches were drawn, with the replays taking place in the following midweek fixture. One match went to a second replay, played the following week.

Second round proper
The eight second-round matches were scheduled for Saturday, 10 February 1900, although only three games were played on this date. The other five games were played the following Saturday. There were three replays, played in the following midweek fixture.

The Southampton v. Newcastle United match was originally played on 10 February but was abandoned after 55 minutes due to a heavy snowstorm.

Third round proper
The four quarter final matches were scheduled for Saturday, 24 February 1900. Three of the four matches were replayed in the following midweek fixture, with the Millwall Athletic – Aston Villa match going to a second replay the following week.

Semifinals

The semi-final matches were both played on Saturday, 24 April 1900. Both matches went to replays, played the following Wednesday or Thursday. Bury and Southampton came through the semi-finals to meet in the final at Crystal Palace.

Replay

Replay

Final

The final took place on Saturday, 21 April 1900 at Crystal Palace.  Just under 69,000 supporters attended the match. Jasper McLuckie opened the scoring for Bury after about 9 minutes. Willie Wood doubled the advantage seven minutes later, before McLuckie added a third seven minutes after that. Jack Plant scored the fourth and final goal in the eightieth minute, to cap a good victory for the northern side.

Match details

See also
FA Cup final results 1872-

References
General
Official site; fixtures and results service at TheFA.com
1899-1900 FA Cup at rsssf.com
1899-1900 FA Cup at soccerbase.com

Specific

1899-1900
1899–1900 in English football
FA